Farewell Bend Park is a  park along the Deschutes River in Bend, Oregon, in the United States.

References

External links
 

Parks in Bend, Oregon